K-Commando (K-Komando) is a tier 1 police tactical unit (PTU) of the Estonian Police and Border Guard Board, created in the 1991. It is a special tactical unit of the Estonian police force similar in function to the SWAT teams in the U.S., and is responsible for such issues as managing: 

-Anti-irregular force.

-Crowd and riot control management.

-Combat search and rescue in hot zones.

-Commando style targets raids.

-Counterinsurgency.

-Engaging heavily-armed criminals.

-Gather field intelligence.

-Hostage rescue situations.

-Infiltrating every target areas by sea, air, and land.

-Monitoring and countering terrorist activities.

-Protecting VIPs and essential witnesses through witness protection programs.

-Securing, transporting, and managing particularly dangerous offenders and criminals.

-Serving high-risk arrest and search warrants.

-Special operations against crimes.

-Support military operation.

-Support search and rescue victims of natural disasters.

-Tracking and capture fugitive criminal. 

-VBSS operation. 

The unit was founded under the name Police Reserve Special Unit by Henn Kask. The unit got its current name in 1993 after the group's commanding officer at that time, Lembit Kolk (retired). They were trained by the GSG 9, HRT, and RAID.

K-Commando is known for its fearsome reputation and high level of professionalism. Recruitment involves rigorous testing and requires the approval of all current team members. Only when a consensus has been reached will the candidate be accepted into the unit. As in other special police units, applicants must have a long service record. The number of members is undisclosed, and there are no known casualties thus far. The unit operates under the command of the Central Criminal Police of Estonia.

Equipment
 Sig Sauer P226 
 Heckler & Koch MP5 - 9mm
 SIG 550 - 5.56×45mm NATO
 Heckler & Koch G36 - 5.56×45mm NATO
 Steyr AUG - 5.56×45mm NATO
 SIG Sauer MCX - 5.56×45mm NATO

References

ATLAS Network
Law enforcement agencies of Estonia
Police tactical units
1991 establishments in Estonia
Special forces of Estonia